Utahconus is an extinct genus of conodonts.

Utahconus purmamarcensis, U. scandodiformis and U. tortibasis are from the Late Cambrian (late Furongian) or early Ordovician (Tremadocian) of the Santa Rosita Formation in the Tilcara Range, Cordillera Oriental of Jujuy in Argentina.

According to J. John Sepkoski, Jr., it's in the order Conodontophoria in the class Conodonta.

References

External links 

 
 

Conodont genera
Cambrian conodonts
Ordovician conodonts
Furongian first appearances
Early Ordovician extinctions
Tremadocian